I Will Say Goodbye is an album by American jazz pianist Bill Evans, recorded in 1977 but not released until 1980.

Reception
At the 23rd Annual Grammy Awards in 1981, I Will Say Goodbye won the Grammy Award for Best Jazz Instrumental Solo and We Will Meet Again won the Best Instrumental Jazz Performance, Group awards.

The AllMusic review by Scott Yanow awarded the album four out of five stars, calling it "[f]ine post-bop music from an influential piano giant".

Track listing
 "I Will Say Goodbye" (Legrand) – 3:30
 "Dolphin Dance" (Herbie Hancock) – 6:04
 "Seascape" (Johnny Mandel) – 5:23
 "Peau Douce" (Steve Swallow) – 4:18
 "Nobody Else but Me" (Hammerstein II, Kern) – 5:06 Bonus track on CD reissue
 "I Will Say Goodbye" [Take 2] (Legrand) – 4:51
 "The Opener" (Bill Evans) – 6:13
 "Quiet Light" (Earl Zindars) – 2:29
 "A House Is Not a Home" (Bacharach, David) – 4:38
 "Orson's Theme" (Legrand) – 3:47 Bonus track on CD reissue

Personnel
Credits adapted from AllMusic.

Bill Evans – piano
Eddie Gómez – bass
Eliot Zigmund – drums

Production
Helen Keane – producer
Bruce Walford – engineer
Phil Bray – photography
Phil Carroll – art direction
Phil DeLancie – digital remastering (reissue)

Chart positions

References

External links
The Bill Evans Memorial Library

1980 albums
Bill Evans albums
Fantasy Records albums